The 1988 Western Illinois Leathernecks football team represented Western Illinois University as a member of the Gateway Collegiate Athletic Conference during the 1988 NCAA Division I-AA football season. They were led by sixth-year head coach Bruce Craddock and played their home games at Hanson Field. The Leathernecks finished the season with a 10–2 record overall and a 6–0 record in conference play, making them conference champions. The team received an automatic bid to the NCAA Division I-AA Football Championship playoffs, where they lost to Western Kentucky in the first round.

Schedule

References

Western Illinois
Western Illinois Leathernecks football seasons
Western Illinois Leathernecks football
Missouri Valley Football Conference champion seasons